Gen is a 2006 Turkish horror film directed by Togan Gökbakar.

Plot
A newly appointed doctor witnesses a series of murders in a hospital which no one can reach due to heavy snow. Everybody is suspicious of each other and searching for the killer, moreover, due to the heavy snow, no one can reach the hospital and telephone lines are jammed. In three days, the hospital, which has been quiet and peaceful over the years, faces a terror that turns nightmares into reality.

Cast

Original
Doga Rutkay as Dr. Deniz
Mahmut Gökgöz as Head Physician Dr. Metin
Cemil Büyükdögerli as Officer Cemil
Mutlu Güney as Dr. Aykut
Yurdaer Okur as Dr. Ragip
Haldun Boysan as Officer Halil
Zeliha Güney as Head Nurse Ipek
Şahan Gökbakar as Separated Patient

English dub cast
Noel Thurman as Dr. Deniz
Michael Roemer as Head Physician Dr. Metin
Devin Reeve as Officer Cemil
Steve Grabowsky as Dr. Aykut
Ali MacLean as Head Nurse Ipek
Julie Fitzgerald as Handan
J. Lauren Proctor as Radio Voice

Production
The film was shot on location in Istanbul, Turkey.

Karl T. Hirsch produced an English language dub of the film.

External links

References

2006 films
2006 horror films
Films set in Turkey
Turkish horror films
Turkish mystery films
Films directed by Togan Gökbakar